Out to Kill is a 2014 film written and directed by independent filmmaker Rob Williams, who has made a name for himself in the gay genre. It was produced by GHF Films Productions and released on Guest House Films.

Synopsis
Out to Kill is a gay-themed film with a "whodunit" murder plot. Gay private investigator Jim Noble (played by Scott Sell) moves into a loft complex in Tampa, to find his first case literally right outside his door – the corpse of one of his neighbors, Justin Jaymes (played by out up-and-coming singer Tom Goss in his film debut), floating in the pool right in the middle of the complex's courtyard. When he is hired to solve the crime, Jim quickly learns that everyone in the complex has secrets, and that someone was willing to kill to keep their secrets hidden.

Cast
Tom Goss as Justin Jaymes
Scott Sell as Jim Noble
Rob Moretti as Gene Sherman
Christopher Patrino as Henry Rutherford
Mark Strano as Vic Barnaby
Lee Williams as Steve
Nicolas Burgos	as Stephen
Christopher Cutillo as Steven
Jeffrey Klein as Mikal Birdwell
Aaron Quick Nelson as Lamar
Joey Panek as Frederico
Michael Kenneth Fahr as Ted
Karleigh Chase	as Ann Fitzsimmons
Mark Manning as Patrick Mason

Screenings and awards
Out to Kill has been shown at the Tampa International Gay & Lesbian Film Festival, qFLIXphiladelphia, the Kansas City LGBT Film Festival, and the North Carolina Gay & Lesbian Film Festival.  It won First Prize, Alternative Spirit Award (LGBTQ) Feature, at the Rhode Island International Film Festival.  It has also toured internationally at the Korea Queer Film Festival and the KASHISH Mumbai International Queer Film Festival.

References

External links

Facebook

2014 films
American mystery films
American LGBT-related films
2014 LGBT-related films
Films scored by Jake Monaco
Gay-related films
2010s English-language films
2010s American films